

Domestic competition 
The Jamaica Rugby League National Club Championship was formed in 2005 and initially consisted of four teams. Throughout the years the numbers have grown. In 2013, there were 20 senior teams featuring in Community, Collegiate and Parish Championships. There are also several High and Primary school programs running throughout Jamaica.

In early 2011, [Hurricanes Rugby League was launched with the intention of developing juniors to play at a professional/semi-professional level.

Governing body 
The Jamaica Rugby League Association is the governing body of Jamaican rugby league, they work with the Rugby League European Federation and the Rugby League International Federation and other rugby league governing bodies across The Americas region.

National team 

The national team is known as the Reggae Warriors. They play regular internationals against Canada and the USA. The team is made up of both local and English based players. They are presently coached by Romeo Monteith.

Their first international was a 37-22 loss to the United States national rugby league team in November 2009. Rugby league in Jamaica is growing with universities and high schools taking up the sport.

Attempts at World Cup qualification
In 2011 Jamaica entered the Rugby League World Cup for the first time as they contested the 2013 Rugby League World Cup qualifying Atlantic section, they failed to qualify after defeating South Africa and losing to the United States.

In 2015 Jamaica aimed to improve on their 2011 disappointment and succeed in the Americas qualification in order to qualify for their first ever World Cup in 2017 but were ultimately unsuccessful.

Historic World Cup qualification
In 2018, Jamaica entered the World Cup qualifying stages for a third time with the matches also doubling up as the 2018 Americas Rugby League Championship.  On 13 November 2018, Jamaica played Canada for a place in the qualification play-off. They defeated Canada 38-8 with Ben Jones-Bishop getting two tries in the victory. On 17 November 2018, Jamaica met the United States at Hodges Stadium, Jacksonville, Florida to play for a place in the 2021 Rugby League World Cup. Jamaica raced into a 16-0 lead within the first 30 minutes of the game only for the United States to score two tries before half-time and pull the score back to 16-10 at the break. The second half was a tighter contest with defence becoming the priority for Jamaica and the half would ultimately end scoreless. Jamaica beat the United States 16-10, defeating United States for the first time in Jamaica's history and qualifying for the 2021 World Cup.

See also
Jamaica National League
Sport in Jamaica

References

External links